John Slade may refer to:

 John Slade (merchant) (1719–1792), British sea captain, shipowner and merchant
 John Slade (field hockey) (1908–2005), German hockey player
 John Slade (politician) (1819–1847), merchant and politician in Newfoundland
 John Ramsay Slade (1843–1913), British general
 John Slade, English schoolmaster and Roman Catholic martyr, see John Bodey
 John Slade, protagonist of Shadowgun, see Shadowgun
John F. Slade III (born 1943), American judge
Sir John Slade, 1st Baronet (1762–1859), British soldier during the Napoleonic Wars

See also
Jack Slade